Sihi Kahi Geetha is an Indian actress and voice-over artist known for her work in Kannada cinema and television. She is noted for performances in Nishyabda (1998), Surya Vamsha (1999), Maleyali Jotheyali (2009) and Actor.

Biography 
Geetha has appeared in more than 50 films in Kannada. She met actor Sihi Kahi Chandru in the sets of the Doordarshan television series Sihi Kahi in 1986 that they appeared together in. In the widely popular series among the Kannada audience, they played the lead protagonists.
They married in 1990. Their daughter Hitha Chandrashekar is an actress and dancer.

Selected filmography

As actress 

 Sididedda Gandu (1990)
 Ramarajyadalli Rakshasaru (1990)
 Bhale Chatura (1990)
 Varagala Bete (1991)
 Modada Mareyalli (1991)
 Kitturina Huli (1991)
 Bhagavan Sri Saibaba (1993)
 Indrana Gedda Narendra (1994)
 Hetta Karulu (1994)
 Shubha Lagna (1995)
 Lady Police (1995)
 Kidnap (1995)
 Betegara (1995)
 Prema Raga Haadu Gelathi (1997)
 Maleyali Jotheyali (2009)
 Sri Harikathe (2010)
 Gowri Putra (2012)
 Haggada Kone (2014)
 Actor (2016)

As voice-over artist 

 Gharshane (1992)
 Banni Ondsala Nodi (1992)
 Shivanna (1993)
 Military Mava (1993)
 Thanikhe (1994)
 Sididedda Pandavaru (1994)
 Gandugali (1994)
 Beda Krishna Ranginata (1994)
 Mojugara Sogasugara (1995)
 Vasantha Kavya (1996)
 Chamundi (2000)
 O Gulaabiye (2005)

Television 
 Sihi Kahi (1986–1987)
 Aadarsha Dampathigalu (2016)
 Jodi No 1 (2022)

See also

List of people from Karnataka
 List of Indian dubbing artists
Cinema of Karnataka
List of Indian film actresses
Cinema of India

References

External links

Actresses in Kannada cinema
Living people
Kannada people
Actresses from Karnataka
Actresses from Bangalore
Indian film actresses
21st-century Indian actresses
Actresses in Kannada television
Year of birth missing (living people)